Jason Paul Hardy (born 14 December 1969) is an English retired professional association footballer who played as a defender. He started with Burnley, making his professional debut in the 0–1 defeat to Aldershot on 21 March 1987.

After leaving Rochdale he signed for Salford City.

References

External links
 

1969 births
Living people
Footballers from Burnley
English footballers
Association football defenders
Burnley F.C. players
Halifax Town A.F.C. players
Rochdale A.F.C. players
English Football League players
Prestwich Heys A.F.C. players
Salford City F.C. players